is a Japanese pop singer and songwriter. Her 1995 debut single "Tomorrow" peaked at number 1 on the Oricon weekly single charts. She released her greatest hits album Rise 1 in 2000. The album topped the Oricon weekly album charts.

Expo 2010 Shanghai China theme song plagiarism 
It was alleged that the promotional song for Expo 2010 Shanghai China, "Right Here Waiting for You 2010", was plagiarized from Okamoto's 1997 song "Sonomama no Kimi de Ite". Okamoto's agency later announced that the Expo Committee subsequently requested permission to use the song, to which Okamoto's agency agreed.

Discography

Albums 
 Sun&Moon (1995/6/10)
 Pureness (1996/3/16)
 Smile (1997/3/5)
 Hello (1998/4/29)
 Crystal Scenery (1998/12/9) (mini-album)
 Mahō no Ring ni Kiss o Shite (魔法のリングにkissをして) (1999/8/4)
 Dear… (2002/3/20)
 Saikai (Kimi ni Tsuzuru) (再会〜君に綴る〜) (2005/5/18)
 Wonderful Colors (2006/1/25) (mini-album)
 Soul Love (2006/12/6)
 seasons (2008/10/29)
 Crystal Scenery II (2009/05/27)

Compilations 
 Mayo Okamoto Best Rise 1 (2000/5/31)
 Mō Ichido Ano Koro no Sora o (もう一度あの頃の空を) (2003/10/22)

Singles 
 Tomorrow (1995/5/10)
 Forever (1996/2/12)
 Alone (1996/11/5)
 Sonomama no Kimi de Ite (そのままの君でいて) (1997/1/16)
 Nakechauhodo Setsunaikedo (泣けちゃうほど せつないけど) (1997/3/5)
 Sayonara/Hoshizora no Sanpomichi (サヨナラ／星空の散歩道) (1997/11/19)
 Daijōbudayo (大丈夫だよ) (1998/2/25)
 Omoide ni Dekinakute (想い出にできなくて) (1998/4/16)
 Everlasting (1998/11/18)
 Takaramono (宝物) (1999/2/10)
 Kono Hoshizora no Kanata (この星空の彼方) (1999/7/7)
 Hapihapi Birthday/Itoshii Hito yo (Remember Me) (ハピハピ バースデイ/愛しい人よ～remember me～) (2001/12/21)
 Dear… (2002/3/13)
 Life (2003/1/22)
 Ai to Iu Na no Hana (愛という名の花) (2003/3/19)
 Kakegae nai Hito yo (かけがえない人よ) (2005/1/13)
 Utsukushiki Hito (美しき人) (2005/4/20)
 Itsuka Kitto (いつかきっと) (2005/11/30)
 Dōsōkai (Dear My Friends) (同窓会～Dear My Friends～) (2006/10/25)
 Destiny (2008/8/6)

Videos 
 Pureness '96 (1996/8/21)
 Mayo Okamoto Smile Tour '97(VHS) (1997/9/19)
 Mayo Okamoto Smile Tour '97(DVD) (2000/6/28)
 Mayo Okamoto Hello Tour '98(VHS) (1998/10/21)
 Mayo Okamoto Hello Tour '98(DVD) (2000/6/28)
 Mayo Okamoto Tour '99 – Maho no Ring (2000/4/5)
 Mayo Okamoto Tour 2000 -RISE- (2001/11/8)
 Mayo Okamoto Clip 1995–1998 (2002/4/3)
 Mayo Okamoto Clip 1998–2002 (2002/4/3)

References

External links 
  
 Mayo Okamoto at Oricon 

Japanese women singer-songwriters
Japanese women pop singers
1974 births
Living people
People from Kōchi Prefecture
Musicians from Kōchi Prefecture
20th-century Japanese women singers
20th-century Japanese singers
21st-century Japanese women singers
21st-century Japanese singers